Fully Loaded may refer to:

Fully Loaded (The Velvet Underground album), 1997 American album, an expanded version of Loaded
WWF Fully Loaded, an annual professional wrestling event held from 1998 to 2000
Herbie: Fully Loaded, a 2005 film
Disney's Herbie: Fully Loaded, 2005 racing video game
Fully Loaded (Lord Kossity album), a 2010 album by Lord Kossity
Fully Loaded 2, a 2012 album by Lord Kossity
Fully Loaded!, a programming block formerly featured on the TV channel Challenge